The 2020 U.S. Olympic gymnastics team trials were held June 24–27, 2021 at The Dome at America's Center in St. Louis.  At the conclusion of the event, USA Gymnastics named both the men's and women's team to represent the United States at the 2020 Summer Olympics.

Venue
In April 2019 USA Gymnastics announced that the 2020 Olympic trials would be held in St. Louis, Missouri and take place at the Enterprise Center.  The event was originally scheduled for June 25–28, 2020.  In March 2020 the Olympic Games were postponed until summer 2021 due to the COVID-19 pandemic.  In July USA Gymnastics announced the new dates for the Olympic trials as June 24–27, 2021.

In May 2021 USA Gymnastics announced that the venue had changed to The Dome at America's Center due to current arena capacity limits and other COVID-related challenges.

Participants

Women

Men

Broadcasting and schedule
NBC broadcast the event.  The schedule is as follows (all times in ET):

 June 24: Men Day 1 – 6:30 p.m. (NBCSN and live stream)
 June 25: Women Day 1 – 8 p.m. (NBC and live stream)
 June 26: Men Day 2 – 3 p.m. (Olympic Channel and live stream) / 4 p.m. (NBC and live stream)
 June 27: Women Day 2 – 8:30 p.m. (NBC and live stream)

Medalists

Results

Women

Final scores

Men

Final scores

Olympic team selection

Women's team
The top two all-around finishers, Simone Biles and Sunisa Lee, were automatically named to the Olympic team.  A selection committee filled out the team with third and fourth place finishers Jordan Chiles and Grace McCallum.  Jade Carey had qualified an individual berth via the Apparatus World Cup series.  The United States women had also earned an additional Olympic spot, separate from the four-person team, which the selection committee gave to 2016 Olympic alternate and fifth place finisher MyKayla Skinner.  Four alternates were selected: Kayla DiCello, Leanne Wong, Kara Eaker, and Emma Malabuyo.

Men's team
The top all-around finisher, Brody Malone, was automatically named to the Olympic team. Because second place finisher Yul Moldauer recorded top three scores on at least three apparatuses, he too was automatically named to the Olympic team. Shane Wiskus and Sam Mikulak, the third and fourth place finishers, were named to the team by the selection committee. The men had also qualified an additional Olympic spot, separate from the four-person team, at the 2021 Pan American Gymnastics Championships.  The selection committee gave this Olympic berth to pommel horse specialist Alec Yoder. Brandon Briones, Cameron Bock, Allan Bower, Akash Modi, and Alex Diab were named as the alternates.

References

Gymnastics
USA Olympic trials
gymnastics
USA Olympic trials